Wenceslao Gonzales O'Reilly (September 28, 1925 – March 11, 1981) was a Cuban-born professional baseball player during the 1950s and 1960s.

Gonzales entered pro baseball in 1951 as a member of the Ciudad Juárez Indios and in his first season, he led the Class C Southwest International League with 32 victories. He followed that by winning 25 and 22 games for the Indios.

In 1955, Gonzales was a member of the Senators' early season roster and appeared in the second game of the campaign, a road contest against the New York Yankees. Called into the game in the seventh inning with Washington already losing 13–1, he worked the final two frames, allowing six hits, six earned runs and three bases on balls in an eventual 19–1 rout.

Gonzales spent the rest of the season in the Arizona–Mexico League and the Mexican League and the rest of his career pitching in Mexico, appearing in a game as late as in 1969.

References

External links

1925 births
1981 deaths
Camaroneros de Ciudad del Carmen players
Diablos Rojos del México players
Indios de Ciudad Juárez (minor league) players
Major League Baseball pitchers
Major League Baseball players from Cuba
Cuban expatriate baseball players in the United States
Nogales Diablos Rojos players
Nogales Yaquis players
People from Quivicán
Pericos de Puebla players
Sultanes de Monterrey players
Washington Senators (1901–1960) players
Cuban emigrants to Mexico